Cantagallo is a town and municipality located in the Bolívar Department, northern Colombia. It is the southernmost  municipality of the province. It was founded on 1 January 1938 and became a municipality by Ordinance no. 30 of 16 December 1994.

Climate
Cantagallo has a tropical monsoon climate (Am) with moderate to little rainfall from December to March and heavy to very heavy rainfall from April to November.

References

Municipalities of Bolívar Department